Andrus is an Estonian masculine given name.

People named Andrus include:
Andrus Ansip (born 1956), Estonian politician
Andrus Aug (born 1972), Estonian road bicycle racer
Andrus Eelmäe (born 1956), Estonian actor
Andrus Johani (1906–1941), Estonian painter
Andrus Kajak (born 1965), Estonian fencer
Andrus Kivirähk (born 1970), Estonian writer
Andrus Murumets (born 1978), Estonian strongman
Andrus Öövel (born 1957), Estonian rower and politician
Andrus Paul (born 1975), Estonian luger
Andrus Poksi (born 1968), Estonian sport sailor and sailing coach 
Andrus Raadik (born 1986), Estonian volleyball player
Andrus Rõuk (born 1957), Estonian artist and poet
Andrus Saare (born 1965), Estonian politician
Andrus Seeme (born 1969), Estonian politician
Andrus Utsar (born 1976), Estonian weightlifter
Andrus Vaarik (born 1958), Estonian actor and theatre director
Andrus Värnik (born 1977), Estonian javelin thrower
Andrus Veerpalu (born 1971), Estonian skier

References

Estonian masculine given names